Frants Diecke Cappelen Beyer (9 May 1851 – 10 November 1918) was a Norwegian average adjuster, tax inspector and composer. He is particularly known for his long-term close friendship with composer Edvard Grieg. A large portion of the letter correspondence between Grieg and Beyer has been preserved and later published.  Among his musical contributions are records of eighteen folk songs which formed the basis for Grieg's opus 66. He was chairman of the board of the Bergen Philharmonic Orchestra for many years.

References

Further reading

1851 births
1918 deaths
Musicians from Bergen
Civil servants from Bergen
Norwegian composers
Norwegian male composers